The Journal of Applied Meteorology and Climatology (JAMC; formerly Journal of Applied Meteorology) is a scientific journal published by the American Meteorological Society.
Applied research related to the physical meteorology, cloud physics, hydrology, weather modification, satellite meteorology, boundary layer processes, air pollution meteorology (including dispersion and chemical processes), agricultural and forest meteorology, and applied meteorological numerical models of all types.

See also 
 List of scientific journals
 List of scientific journals in earth and atmospheric sciences

Atmospheric dispersion modeling
Publications established in 1962
English-language journals
American Meteorological Society academic journals
Climatology journals